The Federal Council is the upper house of the Austrian Parliament, representing the nine States of Austria at the federal level. As part of a bicameral legislature alongside of the National Council, it can be compared with an upper house or a senate. In fact, however, it is far less powerful than the National Council: although it has to approve every new law decided for by this lower chamber, the latter can—in most cases—overrule the Federal Council's refusal to approve.

The Bundesrat has its seat at the Austrian Parliament Building in Vienna, in a conclave of the former Herrenhaus chamber of the Imperial Council (Reichsrat). During a major renovation of the Parliament Building the Federal Council meets in the Hofburg.

Role
As the Constitution of Austria (B-VG) draws a strict distinction between federal and state legislation, its Article 42 provides the Bundesrat only with the right to veto federal laws passed by the National Council. Moreover, in most cases a Federal Council's veto is just suspensive, meaning the National Council can override it, passing the law again by ordinary resolution of at least half of its members. Therefore, the decisions of the Bundesrat can only delay legislation.

In the following cases, though, the Federal Council's approval is mandatory:
 Constitutional laws or regulations limiting the competencies of the federal states
 Laws relating to the rights of the Federal Council itself
 Treaties concerning the jurisdiction of the federal states.

Since its inauguration on 10 November 1920, the deputies of Bundesrat have never achieved the status of a counterbalance in relation to the National Council. Over the decades the role of the Federal Council as a mere adjunct of the Austrian parliament has led to several discussions upon regulatory reforms, towards an actual representation of the states' governments modeled on the German Bundesrat or the complete abolition of the second chamber. So far, the concept has been maintained as a manifestation of Austria's federal system.

The Federal Council and the National Council, if in joint session, form a third parliamentary body: the Federal Assembly that convenes for the oath of office of the President of Austria.

Composition
The 61 members of the Federal Council (Mitglieder des Bundesrats, colloquially called Bundesräte) are elected according to proportional representation by each of the Austrian states' legislatures (Landtage) for 5- to 6-year terms. The composition of the Bundesrat therefore changes after every state election and the distribution of seats in the Austrian Landtage. The second largest faction of the particular Landtag has the right to designate at least one deputy. The number of representatives delegated by each Bundesland ranges between three and twelve, depending on its population as ascertained by a regular census; it is fixed per presidential decree.

The deputies may ally along party lines and form parliamentary groups, which have to meet a quorum of five seats, if not admitted by particular resolution. Currently the MPs of the Austrian People's Party (ÖVP), the Social Democratic Party of Austria (SPÖ), the Freedom Party of Austria (FPÖ) and the GREENS form political groups in the Bundesrat. Although there is a NEOS member, political groups require 5 members: 

The President of the Federal Council is nominated by the largest party of each state in half-yearly intervals.

Presidency

Presidium 
The Federal Council is made up of a president (elected for a term of half a year) and 2 vice-presidents.

See also 
Federal Assembly (Austria)
Politics of Austria
National Council (Austria)

Sources 

Austria
Politics of Austria
Austrian Parliament